The 1949–50 Kansas Jayhawks men's basketball team represented the University of Kansas during the 1949–50 college men's basketball season.

Roster
Clyde Lovellette
Claude Houchin
Jerry Waugh
Bill Hougland
Bill Lienhard
Bob Kenney
Harold England
Gene Petersen
Jack Carby
Dean Wells
Guy Mabry
Clinton Bull
Aubrey Linville
Lyn Smith
Maurice Martin
Dale Engel
Bill Schaake
Jay Drake
Jerry Bogue
Charles Bates
Harold Lowe
Carl Reade

Schedule

Rankings

References

Kansas Jayhawks men's basketball seasons
Kansas
Kansas
Kansas